Broadway Theatre may refer to:
 Broadway theatre, theatrical productions produced in a professional theater on or near Broadway in New York

New York
 Broadway Theatre (53rd Street)
 Broadway Theatre (41st Street) (1888–1929)
 Daly's Theatre (30th St.) or Broadway Theatre (1876–1879)
 New Theatre Comique or Broadway Theatre
 Old Broadway Theatre or Broadway Theatre, (1847–1859)
 Wallack's Theatre or Broadway Theatre (1864–1869)

Elsewhere
 Broadway Theatre (Buenos Aires), Argentina
 Broadway Theatre (Saskatoon), Saskatchewan, Canada
 Broadway Theatre (Toronto), Ontario, Canada
 Broadway Theatre (Prague), Czech Republic
 The Broadway (theatre), Barking, London, UK
 Broadway Theatre, Catford, London Borough of Lewisham, UK
 Broadway Theatre (Mount Pleasant, Michigan), US
 Broadway Theatre (Cape Girardeau, Missouri), US
 Broadway Theatre (Portland, Oregon), US

See also
 Broadway (disambiguation)
 Broadway Cinema, Nottinghamshire, England, UK
 Broadway Cinematheque, Hong Kong